Kentucky Route 715 (KY 715) is a  state highway in western Wolfe County and southern Menifee County that runs from Kentucky Route 11 east of Zachariah to Kentucky Route 77 in the Red River Gorge via Rogers and Pine Ridge. From KY 15 to its northern terminus, KY 715 serves as an important route into the Gorge, with its entire Menifee County portion running parallel to the Red River.

Major intersections

References

0715
0715
0715